A forwarder is a forestry vehicle that carries big felled logs from the stump to a roadside landing.  Unlike a skidder, a forwarder carries logs clear of the ground, which can reduce soil impacts but tends to limit the size of the logs it can move.  Forwarders are typically employed together with harvesters in cut-to-length logging operations.

Load capacity 

Forwarders are commonly categorised on their load carrying capabilities. The smallest are trailers designed for towing behind all-terrain vehicles which can carry a load between 1 and 3 tonnes. Agricultural self-loading trailers designed to be towed by farm tractors can handle load weights up to around 12 to 15 tonnes. Light weight purpose-built machines utilised in commercial logging and early thinning operations can handle payloads of up to 8 tonnes. Medium-sized forwarders used in clearfells and later thinnings carry between 12 and 16 tonnes. The largest class specialized for clearfells handles up to 25 tonnes. Forwarders also carry their load at least 2 feet above the ground.

Manufacturers 
 Barko Hydraulics, LLC
 Caterpillar Inc.
 John Deere (Timberjack)
 EcoLog
 Fabtek
 HSM
 HSM (Hohenloher Spezial Maschinenbau GmbH, Germany)
 Komatsu Forest (Valmet)
 Kronos
 Logset
 Malwa
 Neuson Forest
 PM Pfanzelt Maschinenbau
 Ponsse
 Rottne
 Strojirna Novotny
 Tigercat
 Timber Pro
 Zanello

External links 

Engineering vehicles
Log transport
Forestry equipment